Aberdeen F.C. competed in the Scottish Premier Division, Scottish Cup, League Cup and European Cup Winners' Cup in season 1983–84. They won their third Scottish League championship, won the Scottish Cup for the third successive year and reached the semi-finals of both the League Cup and the European Cup Winners' Cup.

Results

Scottish Premier Division

Final standings

Scottish League Cup

Second round

Group stage

Group 3 Final table

Knockout stage

Scottish Cup

Aberdeen won the Scottish Cup for the third successive season after beating Celtic in the final at Hampden Park in May 1984.

European Cup Winners' Cup

After winning the trophy the previous season, Aberdeen qualified for the 1983–84 European Cup Winners' Cup as holders.

European Super Cup

After winning the UEFA Cup Winners' Cup in the previous season, Aberdeen qualified to play the European Champions' Cup winners from 1983, SV Hamburg, in the Super Cup. Aberdeen won the game 2–0 on aggregate.

Squad

Appearances & Goals

|}

References

 

Aberdeen F.C. seasons
Aberdeen
Scottish football championship-winning seasons